The 1911 Connecticut Aggies football team represented Connecticut Agricultural College, now the University of Connecticut, in the 1911 college football season.  The Aggies were led by first year head coach Leo Hafford, and completed the season with a record of 0–5.  Hafford died on October 1, the day after Connecticut's first game.

Schedule

References

Connecticut
UConn Huskies football seasons
College football winless seasons
Connecticut Aggies football